The 2000 Western Kentucky Hilltoppers football team represented Western Kentucky University in the 2000 NCAA Division I-AA football season and were led by veteran head coach Jack Harbaugh. They won their first conference championship since 1980, going undefeated in the Ohio Valley Conference (OVC) in just their second year after rejoining as a football-only member; the school was a football independent from 1982 through 1998. The Hilltoppers received the OVC's automatic berth to the NCAA Division I-AA playoff, making it to the quarterfinals.  Prior to the start of the season, the OVC gave Western Kentucky an ultimatum, join the conference for all sports or leave. The administration decided to leave and joined the Gateway Football Conference.   The Hilltoppers finished the season ranked No. 5 in final national poll by The Sports Network.

Western Kentucky was ranked first in pass efficiency, scoring defense, and turnover margin out of all NCAA Division I-AA teams.  The team's roster included future National Football League (NFL) players Joseph Jefferson, Mel Mitchell, Sherrod Coates, and Bobby Sippio, and NFL coach Jason Michael.  Sippio and Melvin Wisham were named to the AP All-American team and Harbaugh was OVC Coach of The Year. The All-Conference team included DeWayne Gallishaw, Peter Martinez, Chris Price, Sippio, Wisham, Coates, Jefferson, and Mitchell.

Schedule

References

Western Kentucky
Western Kentucky Hilltoppers football seasons
Ohio Valley Conference football champion seasons
Western Kentucky Hilltoppers football